The Charles H. Dyson School of Applied Economics and Management is a unit within both the College of Agriculture and Life Sciences and the newly founded Cornell S.C. Johnson College of Business of Cornell University, a private Ivy League university located in Ithaca, New York.

With an acceptance rate of 3%, The Dyson School is the most selective program in the Cornell University system. The Dyson School houses Cornell's undergraduate business school as well as graduate education in applied economics. The school focuses on business, agribusiness, environmental and resource economics, and international and development economics offering a Bachelor of Science in Applied Economics and Management and three graduate degrees, M.S., M.P.S. and Ph.D, in Applied Economics and Management.  As of 2017, the Dyson School has 64 full-time faculty and 17 lecturers or adjunct faculty.  In 2015, there were 104 graduate students and 735 undergraduates in Dyson School. Of these 735 undergraduates, 39% are female students and 11% international students. The program was originally named the Department of Agricultural Economics, then renamed Applied Economics and Management in 2002, and most recently, renamed in 2010 in honor of Charles H. Dyson following a US $25 million donation by his family, including his son, John S. Dyson, '65. The program offers students the opportunity to venture into one of 11 distinct concentrations from Accounting to Strategy and these serve to enrich the educational experience of undergraduate and graduate students alike.

Academics 

The department offers one undergraduate major, Applied Economics and Management, which is an AACSB accredited undergraduate business program. Dyson earned a 6th-place ranking in Poets & Quants Best Undergraduate Business Programs of 2016. In fact, U.S. News & World Report ranked Dyson's business program #7 in its 2018 rankings of top undergraduate business programs.  In addition, BusinessWeek's 2014 "Best Undergraduate Business Schools" rankings placed Cornell as the third best program in the country (a ranking it has held for 3 years). Historically, the program has undergone a series of developments regarding the focus of its studies.  Originally conceived as an agriculturally-centered program, it has developed over the years to focus on both resource economics, applied economics, international and development economics, as well as general management.

Undergraduate students may choose one of eleven specializations: Accounting, Agribusiness Management, Applied Economics, Business Analytics, Entrepreneurship, Environment, Energy, and Resource Economics, Finance, Food Industry Management, International Trade and Development, Marketing, and Strategy.

Also, the graduate field of Applied Economics and Management (AEM) in the Charles H. Dyson School of Applied Economics and Management offers 3 degrees: the research-based doctor of philosophy (PhD) degree, master of science (MS) degree, and master of professional studies (MPS) degree. Graduate students may choose from four subject areas: Environmental, Energy, and Resource Economics; Food and Agricultural Economics;  International and Development Economics; and Management.

In the Fall of 2015, the school had 92 incoming freshmen, and approximately 110 transfer students, 45 external transfers and 75 Intra-Cornell transfers. The admittance rate in Fall of 2018 for freshmen, being one of the most selective at Cornell University, was 2.9%.

Finances 
The program is endowed by a $25 million gift from the Dyson family. It also receives annual state appropriations through the SUNY budget. As is the case with all students in the College of Agriculture and Life Sciences, in-state students pay a lower tuition than do out-of-state students. The program is based in Warren Hall which is owned and maintained by New York State. The unit also helps provide farms and businesses in New York with useful information regarding agricultural economics as a part of Cornell's cooperative extension program. The school publishes an annual New York Economic Handbook as well as Extension Bulletins.

See also 

Samuel Curtis Johnson Graduate School of Management, Cornell's graduate business school
Economics
Glossary of economics

References

External links 
 Official site
 Announcement of renaming of school

Cornell University
University departments in the United States
1911 establishments in New York (state)